The 2011 ITU Duathlon World Championships was a duathlon competition held in Gijón, Spain from 24 to 25 September 2011 and organized by the International Triathlon Union (ITU). The championship course included a 10k run, a 38.4k bike, and a 5k run. Titles for amateur duathletes, elite paraduathletes, and elite duathletes were awarded during the two days of competition.

Schedule
24 September
8:30 Junior Women
9:50 Junior Men
11:45 Elite and U23 Women
14:45 Elite and U23 Men
17:45 Paraduathlon

25 September
08:30 Age Group Sprint Distance
10:00 Age Group Olympic Distance
11:00 Paraduathlon Medals Ceremony
15:00 Elite Mixed Team Relay
15:03 Junior Mixed Team Relay
20:00 Closing Ceremony

Results
Katie Hewison, of Great Britain won her first world championship, winning the women's elite division. Sergio Silva won the men's title despite falling behind the leaders during the bike leg. However, Silva charged through the field during the last run segment to claim the win.

Men

Sergio Silva had won the elite men's race but was stripped of his title after testing positive for methylhexaneamine. The positive test resulted in a six-month ban for Silva, instead of the standard two-year suspension, as Silva was able to convince the ITU that he took the substance inadvertently.

Women

4x4 Mixed relay

References

External links
Official event website
Complete Results for 2011 ITU Duathlon World Championships

World Championships
Duathlon World Championships
International sports competitions hosted by Spain
Triathlon competitions in Spain